Adam Sherwin is a British journalist and a former media correspondent for The Times between 1999 and 2010. He covered topics and issues regarding naval architecture, entertainment, music, literature, technology and politics. Sherwin has also ghost-written articles for such politicians as Ed Miliband and Peter Mandelson, working in the Labour media office during the 2010 General Election. He co-founded media news and entertainment website Beehive City in 2010, along with former Times colleagues Dan Sabbagh and Timothy Glanfield.

He now writes for The Independent and the Belfast Telegraph.

References

External links

All articles by Adam Sherwin

British male journalists
Living people
Year of birth missing (living people)